John Paul Hart (8 June 1928 – 26 November 2018) was an English football player and manager who spent his entire career with Manchester City.

Biography 
Golborne-born Hart played for Manchester City as an inside forward in 169 Football League matches between 1947 and 1961, scoring 67 goals, in a career disrupted by injury. He succeeded Malcolm Allison as the club's manager for six monthsfrom March to October 1973before ill-health forced him to retire. He was inducted into Manchester City's Hall of Fame in 2006.

Hart's sons Paul and Nigel both played league football as centre halves. Paul also followed his father into management.

References

1928 births
2018 deaths
People from Golborne
English footballers
Association football inside forwards
Manchester City F.C. players
English Football League players
English football managers
Manchester City F.C. managers
English Football League managers